Elections were held in Central Luzon for seats in the House of Representatives of the Philippines on May 9, 2016.

The candidate with the most votes won that district's seat for the 17th Congress of the Philippines.

Summary

Aurora
Incumbent Bellaflor Angara-Castillo, is running for reelection. Her opponent is former Vice Governor Annabelle Tangson.

Bataan

1st District
Incumbent Herminia Roman is term-limited.

2nd District
Incumbent Enrique Garcia is not running. His son, incumbent Balanga Mayor Joet Garcia is his party's nominee and is running unopposed.

Bulacan

1st District
Ma. Victoria Sy-Alvarado is term-limited. She changed her party affiliation from NUP to Liberal. Her son Jose Antonio is her party's nominee.

2nd District
Gavini "Apol" Pancho is the Incumbent.

3rd District
Joselito Mendoza is the incumbent. His opponent is Former 3rd District Representatives and Former San Rafael Mayor Lorna Silverio.

≥u

4th District
Linabelle Villarica is the incumbent. Her opponent is Meycauayan City Mayor Joan Alarilla.

≥u

Nueva Ecija

1st District
Estrelita Suansing is the incumbent. She changed her party affiliation from Unang Sigaw to Liberal.

2nd District
Joseph Gilbert Violago is term limited.

3rd District
Czarina Umali is term limited and she is running for Governor.

4th District
Magnolia Antonino-Nadres is the incumbent. She changed her party affiliation from NUP to UNA.

Pampanga

1st District
Yeng Guiao is the incumbent. He changed his party affiliation from NUP/KAMBILAN to Liberal. He will face Carmelo "Jon-Jon" Lazatin II, son of former Representative Carmelo "Tarzan" Lazatin, Sr.

|-
|
|colspan="6"| Lingap Lugud gain from KAMBILAN
|-

2nd District
Incumbent Gloria Macapagal Arroyo is running for her last term unopposed despite of her sickness and in hospital arrest.

3rd District
Oscar Rodriguez is the incumbent. He will facing-off former congressman Aurelio Gonzales, Jr.

4th District
Juan Pablo Bondoc is the incumbent.

San Jose del Monte
Incumbent Arthur Robes is running for Mayor, His wife Rida is running against Incumbent Vice Mayor Eduardo Roquero, Jr.

Tarlac

1st District

2nd District

3rd District
Noel Villanueva is the incumbent. He changed his party affiliation from Nacionalista to NPC.

Zambales

1st District
Jeffrey Khonghun is the incumbent.

2nd District
Cheryl Deloso-Montalla is the incumbent.

References

External links
Official COMELEC results 2016

2016 Philippine general election
Lower house elections in Central Luzon